Manuel Antonio Barrios (born September 21, 1974) is a former Major League Baseball right-handed pitcher for the Los Angeles Dodgers, Houston Astros and Florida Marlins. He pitched in five games during the 1997 and 1998 seasons.

External links
, or Retrosheet
Pelota Binaria (Venezuelan Winter League)

1974 births
Living people
Albuquerque Dukes players
Binghamton Mets players
Charlotte Knights players
Florida Marlins players
Guerreros de Oaxaca players
Houston Astros players
Indianapolis Indians players
Jackson Generals (Texas League) players
Leones del Caracas players
Los Angeles Dodgers players
Major League Baseball pitchers
Major League Baseball players from Panama
Mexican League baseball pitchers
Navegantes del Magallanes players
Panamanian expatriate baseball players in Venezuela
New Orleans Zephyrs players
Newark Bears players
Panamanian expatriate baseball players in Mexico
Panamanian expatriate baseball players in the United States
People from Chiriquí Province
Quad Cities River Bandits players
Scranton/Wilkes-Barre Red Barons players
Tigres de Aragua players